Ban Lueam station is a railway station located in Wang Pho Subdistrict, Ban Lueam District, Nakhon Ratchasima Province.

References 

Railway stations in Thailand
Nakhon Ratchasima province